That Wonderful Urge is a 1948 20th Century Fox screwball comedy film directed by Robert B. Sinclair and starring Tyrone Power and Gene Tierney. It is a remake of Love Is News (1937), which stars Power and Loretta Young.

Plot 
Newspaper reporter Thomas Jefferson Tyler writes a series of unflattering articles under the title "The Life and Loves of Sara Farley", infuriating the wealthy grocery-store heiress target of his stories. He impersonates a small-town newspaper manager named "Tom Thomas" sympathetic to her plight and maneuvers to get her to talk about herself. He finds her down to earth and writes a much different article about her. However, Sara finds out about the deception and tells the press that the two of them got married and that she gave him a million dollars. When Duffy, Tom's editor, reads the story, he promptly fires Tom. Hijinks ensue as Tom tries to clear himself. Eventually, he sues Sara for libel.

Cast 
 Gene Tierney as Sara Farley
 Tyrone Power as Thomas Jefferson Tyler
 Reginald Gardiner as Count Andre De Guyon
 Arleen Whelan as Jessica Woods
 Lucile Watson as Aunt Cornelia Farley
 Gene Lockhart as Judge Parker
 Lloyd Gough as Duffy, Chronicle Editor
 Porter Hall as Attorney Ketchell
 Richard Gaines as Whitson - Farley's Executive
 Taylor Holmes as Attorney Rice
 Chill Wills as Homer Beggs, Justice of the Peace in Monroe Township

Notes

External links 
 
 

1948 films
1948 romantic comedy films
American romantic comedy films
American screwball comedy films
American black-and-white films
Remakes of American films
Films about journalists
20th Century Fox films
Films directed by Robert B. Sinclair
Films scored by Cyril J. Mockridge
1940s English-language films
1940s American films